Sean Quinlan is an American politician currently serving as the Hawaii state representative for Hawaii's 47st district. He is a member of the Economic Development committee, the Education committee, the Higher Education and Technology committee, and the Labor and Tourism committee.

References

Democratic Party members of the Hawaii House of Representatives
George Mason University alumni
Year of birth missing (living people)
Living people
21st-century American politicians